The 2009–10 Icelandic Hockey League season was the 19th season of the Icelandic Hockey League, the top level of ice hockey in Iceland. Three teams participated in the league, and Skautafelag Akureyrar won the championship.

Regular season

Final 
 Skautafélag Akureyrar - Ísknattleiksfélagið Björninn 3:2 (1:4, 7:4, 2:3 n.P., 3:2, 6:2)

External links 
 2009-10 season.info

Icelandic Hockey League
Icelandic Hockey League seasons
2009–10 in Icelandic ice hockey